The 1st Connecticut Infantry Regiment, officially designated the 1st Regiment Connecticut Volunteer Infantry, was an infantry regiment that served in the Union Army during the American Civil War. Men were recruited under the calls of President Lincoln on 15 April, 1861 and Governor Buckingham the following day.

Service

Many Connecticut residents had anticipated a call to arms, and, as a result, several companies had already reached their manpower requirements by the 16th.The 1st Connecticut Infantry Regiment was organized in Hartford, Connecticut and was mustered in for three months service on April 22, 1861 under the command of Colonel Daniel Tyler. John Speidel was elected Lieutenant Colonel. The regiment left for Washington D.C. on 18 May on the steamer Bienville and served at Fort Corcoran as part of the capitol garrison. It was attached to Mansfield's command in the Department of Washington until 1 June. The regiment was assigned to Key's 1st Brigade, Tyler's Division, McDowell's Army of Northeastern Virginia on 1 June and advanced to Vienna and Falls Church in northern Virginia between 1 and 8 June. It served on picket duty there until 16 July, then participated in the advance on Manassas, occupying Fairfax Court House on 17 July. The regiment fought in the First Battle of Bull Run on 21 July, and was lauded for maintaining discipline during the retreat of the Union troops. It spent the next few days packing up the abandoned camps of other regiments. The 1st began to march to New Haven on 27 July, and was mustered out of service on 31 July.

During the unit's service, 6 men were wounded, 6 were captured, and 25 were discharged for disability.

See also

 Connecticut in the American Civil War
 List of Connecticut Civil War units

References

Citations

Bibliography 
 
 Tyler, Elnathan B. "Wooden Nutmegs" at Bull Run: A Humorous Account of Some of the Exploits and Experiences of the Three Months Connecticut Brigade, and the Part They Bore in the National Stampede (Hartford, CT:  G. L. Coburn), 1872.

Attribution
 

Military units and formations established in 1861
Military units and formations disestablished in 1861
1st Connecticut Infantry Regiment
1861 establishments in Connecticut